Annamarie Thomas (15 September 1971) is a former Dutch speed skater.

Biography
Thomas was an allround speed skater, but favored the shorter distances. The years 1995 and 1996 found her at her peak: in both those years she was Dutch allround champion as well as Dutch sprint champion and came in second at the European Allround Championships behind Gunda Niemann. She was third in the 1995 World Allround Championships in Savalen and in 1996 won both the 1000 and 1500 m in the inaugural World Single Distance Championships in Hamar.

On 20 March 1999 in the Olympic Oval in Calgary, she broke the world record in 1500 m. by 1.5 seconds, skating in 1.55.50. That weekend she also broke the world record for the combined times for the 500, 1000, 1500 and 3000 m in one tournament (the "mini combination") and reached 4th place in the adelskalender.

In the summer of 2006 she was a participant in the first season of the celebreality show Sterren Dansen Op Het IJs, the Dutch version of Skating with Celebrities, where she ended up in fourth place.

She retired from competitive skating in November 2006.

Records

Personal records

World records

Medals

References

External links 
 Official site
 Palmares

1971 births
Dutch female speed skaters
Speed skaters at the 1994 Winter Olympics
Speed skaters at the 1998 Winter Olympics
Olympic speed skaters of the Netherlands
World record setters in speed skating
People from Emmeloord
Living people
Sportspeople from Noordoostpolder
World Allround Speed Skating Championships medalists
World Single Distances Speed Skating Championships medalists
20th-century Dutch women
21st-century Dutch women